Georgios Salavantakis (born 10 September 1970 in Chania, Crete) is a Greek sport shooter. He won a gold medal in men's skeet shooting at the 2004 ISSF World Cup series in Sydney, Australia, with a total score of 148 points.

Salavantakis represented the host nation Greece at the 2004 Summer Olympics in Athens, where he placed twenty-first in men's skeet shooting, with a total score of 120 points, tying his position with seven other shooters, including former Olympic champion Ennio Falco of Italy, and five-time Olympian Guillermo Alfredo Torres of Cuba.

At the 2008 Summer Olympics in Beijing, Salavantakis competed for the second time, as a 38-year-old, in men's skeet shooting. He finished only in thirty-third place by one point behind Ukraine's Mikola Milchev from the final attempt, for a total score of 109 points.

References

External links
NBC Olympics Profile

Greek male sport shooters
Skeet shooters
Living people
Olympic shooters of Greece
Shooters at the 2004 Summer Olympics
Shooters at the 2008 Summer Olympics
Sportspeople from Chania
1970 births